Derby High School could refer to several high schools:

England 
 Derby High School, Bury in Greater Manchester
 Derby High School, Derbyshire in Derby

United States 

 Derby High School (Connecticut) in Derby, Connecticut
 Derby High School (Kansas) in Derby, Kansas